Egyptian Fourth Division is a football division in Egypt. It is the fourth level on the Egyptian football league system.

4